Liari is a town and union council of Uthal Tehsil in Balochistan province, Pakistan. It is located at 25°41'20N 66°29'26E with an altitude of 11 metres (39 feet).

References

Union councils of Lasbela District
Populated places in Lasbela District